Rebecca Atkinson (born 1983) is an English actress

Rebecca Atkinson may also refer to:

Rebecca Atkinson (curler) (born 1982), Canadian curler and lawyer
Rebecca Atkinson-Lord (fl. 2000s–2010s), British director and writer